Ugra is an urban locality (an urban-type settlement) in Ugransky District of Smolensk Oblast, Russia. Population:

Climate
Ugra has a warm-summer humid continental climate (Dfb in the Köppen climate classification).

<div style="width:70%;">

References

Urban-type settlements in Smolensk Oblast